Frederic Mullally (25 February 1918 – 7 September 2014) was a British journalist, public relations executive, and novelist. He was born in London.

Career
Mullally's journalism career began in India where, from 1937 to 1949, he was sub-editor on The Statesman of Calcutta, then editor of the Sunday Standard of Bombay. Back in London he worked as a sub-editor of The Financial News, as co-editor of the weekly Tribune, and finally as political editor and columnist of the Sunday Pictorial. From 1950 to 1955, he headed the public relations firm of Mullally & Warner, with clients ranging from Audrey Hepburn and Frank Sinatra to Douglas Fairbanks, Jr., Paul Getty, Frankie Laine, the Festival Ballet and Picture Post. Others included; Vera Lynn, Yvonne De Carlo, Guy Mitchell, Sonja Henie, Line Renaud, Johnnie Ray, Jo Stafford, Les Paul and Mary Ford, and the Oxford University Press and its counterpart, Cambridge University Press, as well as the Hulton Press.

In 1956, he was the only person to receive an interview with the newly married Prince Rainier of Monaco and his new wife, Grace Kelly, then on their honeymoon on the Prince's yacht while anchored off the Mediterranean island of Ibiza, a request granted to Mullally as, apart from being a resident of the island himself, he had been the only one of a pack of journalists to show appropriate respect for the feelings of the couple on their special occasion.

Mullally's first novel was the 1958 world best-seller Danse Macabre. This was followed by eleven more titles. His semi-autobiographical novel Clancy was dramatised by the BBC in five one-hour television episodes in 1975 and 1977 under the title Looking for Clancy, starring Robert Powell and Keith Drinkel. Between books, Mullally compiled and wrote with the collaboration with the BBC an album, The Sounds of Time a dramatised history of Britain (1933–45) and the long running Penthouse magazine's erotic strip cartoon "Oh Wicked Wanda!". In 1949, he abandoned a prospective candidature of the Labour Party for the parliamentary constituency of Finchley and Friern Barnet. Late in his life he contributed occasional freelance journalism. He died in 2014 at the age of 96.

Personal life
He was married to the actress Rosemary Nicols from 27 September 1971 until his death on 7 September 2014.

Selected bibliography

Fiction
 Danse Macabre (1958) published as Marianne in the US
 Man with Tin Trumpet (1961) published as Sara in the US
 Split Scene (1963)
 The Assassins (1964)
 No Other Hunger (1966)
 The Prizewinner (1967)
 The Munich Involvement (1968)
 Clancy (1971)
 The Malta Conspiracy (1972)
 Venus Afflicted (1973)
 Hitler Has Won (1975)
 The Deadly Payoff (1976)
 The Daughters (1988)

Non-fiction
 Death Pays a Dividend (1944) with Fenner Brockway
 Fascism Inside England (1946)
 The Penthouse Sexicon (1968) humorous guide
 The Silver Salver: The Story of the Guinness Family (1981)
 Primo: The Story of Man-Mountain Carnera (1991).

References

External links
 John Simkin: Frederic Mullally, Spartacus Educational, 1997, 2014 (per 2018)

Frederic Mullally Official Website

1918 births
2014 deaths
English non-fiction writers
English male journalists
English male novelists
20th-century English novelists
20th-century English male writers
British erotica writers
British comics writers
Writers from London
British people in colonial India